Niccolò Campriani (born November 6, 1987) is an Italian sport shooter and shooting coach. He competed at the 2008 Summer Olympics in Beijing in the men's 10 metre air rifle, men's small-bore rifle, three positions, 50 metres and men's small-bore rifle, prone, 50 metres, and at the 2012 Summer Olympics in the men's 10 metre air rifle, winning silver, and in the men's 50 metre rifle three positions, where he won gold with a total of 1278.5 points.

Biography
After participating in the 2008 Summer Olympics, achieving his best result in 12th place in the 10 meter rifle, he won the gold medal at Euro 2009. On July 31, 2010 he won the gold medal at the World Shooting Championships in the 10 meter rifle, qualifying for the 2012 Summer Olympics. This made him the first Italian to become a world champion in shooting. On July 29, 2012 he won the silver medal at the Olympics in the 10 m rifle final. On August 6, 2012 he won a gold medal at the Olympics in the 50 m three position rifle final. He was also the first Italian in the history of shooting to win an individual world title. In the same competition he also won a bronze medal in the team in the same discipline. In 2011 he earned a bronze medal at the European championships. He also won the gold medal in the 2016 Summer Olympics in the 10m Air Rifle Event on 8 August 2016.

In 2018, Campriani was appointed as the shooting coach of the Italian national biathlon team.

See also
 Italy national shooting team

References

External links
 

Italian male sport shooters
Living people
1987 births
Olympic shooters of Italy
Olympic gold medalists for Italy
Olympic silver medalists for Italy
Shooters at the 2008 Summer Olympics
Shooters at the 2012 Summer Olympics
Shooters at the 2016 Summer Olympics
Olympic medalists in shooting
Sportspeople from Florence
Medalists at the 2012 Summer Olympics
Medalists at the 2016 Summer Olympics
Shooters at the 2015 European Games
European Games gold medalists for Italy
European Games silver medalists for Italy
European Games medalists in shooting
Universiade medalists in shooting
Italian sports coaches
Mediterranean Games gold medalists for Italy
Mediterranean Games medalists in shooting
Competitors at the 2013 Mediterranean Games
Universiade gold medalists for Italy
West Virginia University alumni
Shooters of Fiamme Gialle
Shooters of Gruppo Sportivo Esercito